Aero Nord ULM (ultra-léger motorisé) was a French aircraft manufacturer based in Lorgies, and later in Bénifontaine. The company specialized in the design and manufacture of paramotors in the form of ready-to-fly aircraft in the US FAR 103 Ultralight Vehicles rules and the European microlight category.

While no longer an aircraft manufacturer, the company continues as an ultralight aircraft  flight school using autogyros and ultralight trikes, as well as a dealer for Aeros products, with Frédéric Bastien as chief instructor.

In the mid-2000s the company manufactured a line of paramotors called the Aero Nord AIR. Reviewer Rene Coulon wrote in 2003 that the design "shows good understanding of the market and skill in the production" and noted that the series had attracted "considerable attention".

Aircraft

References

External links

Defunct aircraft manufacturers of France
Ultralight aircraft
Ultralight trikes
Autogyros
Paramotors